Unkana is a genus of grass skipper in the family Hesperiidae. The genus is confined to the Indomalayan realm.

Species

Unkana ambasa (Moore, [1858])
U. a. ambasa Sumatra, Malaya, Philippines, Java
U. a. attina (Hewitson, [1866]) S.Vietnam, Burma, Thailand, Laos
U. a. batara Distant, 1886 S.Vietnam, Malaya, Thailand, Langkawi, Singapore, Borneo, Sumatra, Batoe
U. a. tranga Evans, 1949 Nias
Unkana flava Evans, 1932 Burma, N.Thailand, Laos, N.Vietnam.
Unkana mindanensis Fruhstorfer, 1911 Philippines
Unkana mytheca (Hewitson, 1877)
U. m. mytheca Malaya, S.Burma, Thailand, Malaysia, Borneo, Sumatra, Bangka
U. m. kala (Evans, 1932) Nias

References
Natural History Museum Lepidoptera genus database
Funet

Hesperiinae
Hesperiidae genera